Gościsław may refer to the following places in Poland:
Gościsław in Gmina Udanin, Środa Śląska County in Lower Silesian Voivodeship (SW Poland)
Other places called Gościsław (listed in Polish Wikipedia)